The Al Furqan Brigades are a militant group that has been active throughout Egypt. The brigades attacked a container ship that was passing through the Suez Canal in September 2013. The group attacked a communications center in Maadi with RPGs in October 2013.

References

Jihadist groups in Egypt
Organisations of the Egyptian Crisis (2011–2014)